The North American section of the 2018 FIVB Volleyball Women's Challenger Cup qualification acts as qualifiers for the 2018 FIVB Volleyball Women's Challenger Cup, for national teams which are members of the North, Central America and Caribbean Volleyball Confederation (NORCECA). This tournament was held in Edmonton, Canada. The eventual winner will earn the right to compete in the 2018 FIVB Volleyball Women's Challenger Cup.

Qualification
6 NORCECA national teams entered qualification. Costa Rica withdrew before the tournament began.

Pool standing procedure
 Number of matches won
 Match points
 Sets ratio
 Points ratio
 Result of the last match between the tied teams

Match won 3–0: 5 match points for the winner, 0 match points for the loser
Match won 3–1: 4 match points for the winner, 1 match point for the loser
Match won 3–2: 3 match points for the winner, 2 match points for the loser

Round robin
Venue:  Edmonton Expo Centre, Edmonton, Canada
All times are Canada Mountain Time (UTC−07:00).

Group A

Group B

3rd place match

Final

Final standing

References

Women's volleyball competitions
FIVB
2018 FIVB Volleyball Women's Challenger Cup qualification